The 2010–11 Mid-American Conference women's basketball season began with practices in October 2010, followed by the start of the 2010–11 NCAA Division I women's basketball season in November. Conference play began in January 2011 and concluded in March 2011. Toledo won the regular season title with a record of 14–2 by one game over Bowling Green. Kourtney Brown of Buffalo was named MAC player of the year.

Second seeded Bowling Green won the MAC tournament over fifth seeded Eastern Michigan. Lauren Prochaska of Bowling Green was the tournament MVP. Bowling Green lost to Georgia Tech in the first round of the NCAA tournament. Toledo, Central Michigan, Kent State, and Eastern Michigan played in the WNIT. Toledo won the WNIT championship by defeating USC in the final.

Preseason awards
The preseason poll and league awards were announced by the league office on October 27, 2010.

Preseason women's basketball poll
(First place votes in parenthesis)

East Division
 
 
 
 
 Ohio

West Division
 Toledo

Tournament champs
Bowling Green

Honors

Postseason

Mid–American tournament

NCAA tournament

Women's National Invitational Tournament

Postseason awards

Coach of the Year: Tricia Cullop, Toledo
Player of the Year: Kourtney Brown, Buffalo
Freshman of the Year: Niki DiGuilio, Central Michigan
Defensive Player of the Year: Kourtney Brown, Buffalo
Sixth Man of the Year: Jasmine Mushington, Akron and Taylor Johnson, Central Michigan

Honors

See also
2010–11 Mid-American Conference men's basketball season

References